A Nice Little Bank That Should Be Robbed is a 1958 American comedy film directed by Henry Levin and written by Sydney Boehm. The film stars Tom Ewell, Mickey Rooney, Mickey Shaughnessy, Dina Merrill, Madge Kennedy and Frances Bavier. The film was released on December 1, 1958, by 20th Century Fox.

Plot
Auto mechanic Max Rutgers is spinning his wheels, going nowhere. He has been promising sweetheart Margie Solitaire for five years that they will marry, but wishes he had more money to support her.

His best pal, Gus Harris, knows a lot about racehorses, but keeps flunking his exam to become a licensed trainer. Fed up, he and Max decide to rob a bank, succeeding in a heist of $28,000. They use the money to buy a horse, Tattooed Man, but an acquaintance, cabbie and bookie Rocky Baker, figures out how they got the money and wants to be cut in on a share.

Max and Gus bet their life savings on Tattooed Man's next race. When their horse is victorious, only to be disqualified for a rules infraction, they become desperate and decide to rob another bank. A series of errors ensues, teller Grace Havens being held hostage, the vault being on a timer and unable to be opened until morning, and bank manager Schroeder coming along for the ride in his own vehicle when the getaway car they stole from Margie isn't there.

The police ultimately trace the thieves to Margie's house and take the crooks into custody. Max, Gus and Rocky are behind bars together when they hear a radio broadcast of a big race that Tattooed Man wins.

Cast
Tom Ewell as Max Rutgers
Mickey Rooney as Gus Harris
Mickey Shaughnessy as Harold 'Rocky' Baker
Dina Merrill as Margie Solitaire
Madge Kennedy as Grace Havens
Frances Bavier as Mrs. Solitaire
Richard Deacon as Milburn Schroeder
Stanley Clements as Fitz

References

External links
 

1958 films
1950s crime comedy films
20th Century Fox films
American black-and-white films
American crime comedy films
American heist films
Films about bank robbery
Films directed by Henry Levin
1958 comedy films
1950s English-language films
1950s American films